Deh-e Ahmad (also Romanized as Deh-e Aḩmad and Deh Aḩmad) is a village in Kuhsar Rural District, in the Central District of Shazand County, Markazi Province, Iran. At the 2006 census, its population was 172, in 44 families.

References 

Populated places in Shazand County